Misaeng may refer to:

 Misaeng (manhwa), a 2012 manhwa
 Misaeng (TV series), a 2014 TV series